One third of Leeds City Council in the City of Leeds, West Yorkshire, England is elected each year, followed by no election in one year out of every four years. A total of 99 councillors have been elected from 33 electoral wards across Leeds since 1980.

Political control

From 1889 until 1974 Leeds was a county borough, independent from any county council. Under the Local Government Act 1972 it had its territory enlarged and became a metropolitan borough, with West Yorkshire County Council providing county-level services. The first election to the reconstituted city council was held in 1973, initially operating as a shadow authority before coming into its revised powers on 1 April 1974. West Yorkshire County Council was abolished in 1986 and Leeds became a unitary authority. Political control of the council since 1973 has been held by the following parties:

Leadership
The first leader of the reformed council in 1974, Albert King, had been the last leader of the old county borough of Leeds. The leaders of the council since 1974 have been:

From 2004 until 2010 a coalition agreement between the Conservatives and Liberal Democrats saw the leadership alternate every six months between their party leaders.

Council elections

Summary of the council composition after council elections, click on the year for full details of each election. Boundary changes took place for the 1980 election which increased the number of seats by 3, leading to the whole council being elected in that year. Further boundary changes made in 2004 again required the full council to be elected.

Borough result maps

By-election results
Following the death, removal or resignation of an incumbent councillor between council elections, by-elections occur to elect a successor to fill the vacant council seat. The most recent by-election took place on 12 December 2019 after the death of incumbent Wetherby ward councillor, Gerald Wilkinson, in October 2019.

References

External links
Leeds City Council

 
Council elections in West Yorkshire
Local government in Leeds
Elections in Leeds
Leeds